The Leonardo Express is an airport rail service linking the center of Rome with its largest airport, Leonardo da Vinci-Fiumicino Airport, in the region of Lazio, central Italy.

The service was scheduled to open in December 1989, with nonstop and stop services available.

See also

Malpensa Express
Roma Express
History of rail transport in Italy
Rail transport in Italy

References

External links

Leonardo Express' Timetables

Airport rail links
Passenger rail transport in Italy
Transport in Rome
Fiumicino